The 1985 Nations motorcycle Grand Prix was the fourth race of the 1985 Grand Prix motorcycle racing season. It took place on the weekend of 24–26 May 1985 at the Mugello Circuit.

Classification

500 cc

References

Italian motorcycle Grand Prix
Italian
Motorcycle
Nations motorcycle Grand Prix